The Search for WondLa is a children's science fiction fantasy novel by Tony DiTerlizzi published in 2010. It is the first book of the WondLa series. The website dedicated to the book had an innovative section which interacts with the book's illustrations via webcam.

Description from the book 
Eva Nine had never seen the actual sun before, or walked outdoors. In fact, she had never even seen another living person in all twelve years of her life. That changes when a marauding huntsman destroys her underground home and sends her fleeing for her life. She is desperate to find someone else who is like her, and a single clue gives her hope: a crumbling picture of a girl, a robot, an adult, and the word "WondLa".

Plot summary 
Eva Nine has reached the age of 12 living her whole life in an underground Sanctuary. She has been raised by a robot named "Muthr" (Multi-Utility Task Help Robot zero-six), and knows only of the outside world through holograms and a small piece of cardboard inscribed with the fragmented words "Wond" and "La." When the facility is attacked by a large creature named Besteel, she is forced to leave Muthr behind and flee her home. Upon seeing the outside world for the first time she remarks that it is nothing like the holographic simulations she had been brought up on, encountering many dangerous and alien species of plants and animals that her Omnipod device fails to identify.

After another encounter with Besteel and meeting an alien named Rovender Kitt and a large behemoth Otto (identified as a giant water bear by the Omnipod), Eva reunites with Muthr in her (now demolished) home and convinces the Sanctuary computer to allow the robot to escort her to the next underground Sanctuary. When they find it abandoned they convince Rovender to lead them to the royal city of Solas.

The group has several more encounters with Besteel and other aliens, in which Eva is nearly embalmed for display at the royal museum. While in the museum she learns that the life forms of this planet (called "Orbona" by its natives) arrived long ago on a dead world that they "reawakened" for their own use. She also discovers many ancient human artifacts and learns of a ruined human civilization beyond a dangerous desert.

Eva, Muthr, Rovender, and Otto cross the desert to discover the remains of an ancient human city buried under the sands. Besteel soon arrives and attacks, severely damaging Muthr. Eva then uses her Omnipod to attract several deadly Sand Snipers that kill Besteel and drag him beneath the sand. Muthr, unable to be repaired, dies shortly afterwards, and when the remaining characters tunnel into one of the buried buildings they discover that it was once the New York Public Library, meaning Orbona was once Earth. The still-functioning library computer identifies the cardboard "WondLa" as the cover of The Wonderful Wizard of Oz, by L. Frank Baum. This leads her to the conclusion that Earth died, and was reawakened as Orbona.

In the epilogue, a human boy named Hailey swoops down from the sky in an airship named the Bijou and informs Eva that he is there to take her home.

Sequel 
In the front description of the book, it is stated that "The Search is just the beginning" and that The Search for WondLa is the start of a trilogy. The second book, A Hero for WondLa, was published on May 8, 2012. Amazon description: "Finally, Eva Nine has gotten what she has always wanted: other humans. When she and her friends are rescued by Hailey, another human, Eva couldn't be happier. Now she has everything she has ever dreamed of. Hailey brings Eva and her friends to the human colony New Attica (possibly a rebuilt version of Attica, New York) where humans of all shapes and sizes live in apparent peace and harmony.

But not all is idyllic in New Attica, and soon Eva Nine and her friends realize that something very bad is going on–and if they don't stop it, it could mean the end of everything and everyone on Orbona."

The final book is The Battle for WondLa (2014). In this one, Eva Nine has to save the people of Orbona from Cadmus.

Adaptation 
In February 2021, it was announced that Apple Studios, in partnership with Skydance Animation, was creating a television adaptation of The Search for WondLa to air on Apple TV+. It will be written and executive produced by showrunner  Lauren Montgomery. She has since left the project and has been replaced by Bobs Gannaway, another of Lasseter's Disney-era colleagues. The series will be debuting in 2023 with new editions in hardcovers and paperback by September.

References

External links

Official website

2010 American novels
Children's science fiction novels
American children's novels
Post-apocalyptic novels
Science fantasy novels
2010 children's books
Simon & Schuster books